Discus marmorensis, common name "the marbled disc", is a species of small, air-breathing, land snail, a terrestrial pulmonate gastropod mollusk in the family Discidae, the disk snails. This species is endemic to the United States.

References

 

Discidae
Molluscs of the United States
Gastropods described in 1932
Taxonomy articles created by Polbot